Norman L. Eisen (born November 11, 1960) is an American attorney, author, and former diplomat. He is a senior fellow in governance studies at the Brookings Institution, a CNN legal analyst, and the co-founder and executive chair of the States United Democracy Center. He was co-counsel for the House Judiciary Committee during the first impeachment and trial of President Donald Trump in 2020. He served as White House Special Counsel for Ethics and Government Reform, United States Ambassador to the Czech Republic, and board chair of Citizens for Responsibility and Ethics in Washington (CREW). He is the author of four books, including The Last Palace: Europe's Turbulent Century in Five Lives and One Legendary House (2018). In 2022, he co-authored Overcoming Trumpery: How to Restore Ethics, the Rule of Law, and Democracy.

Early life and education 
Eisen's parents were immigrants to the United States of Jewish ancestry and he was educated at Hollywood High School in Los Angeles, growing up working in his family's hamburger stand in the city. He received his B.A. degree from Brown University in 1985 and his J.D. degree from Harvard Law School in 1991, both with honors. While at Harvard, he met future president Barack Obama, then also a first-year law student.

Professional career 
From 1985 to 1988, between college and law school, Eisen worked as the assistant director of the Los Angeles office of the Anti-Defamation League. He investigated antisemitism and other civil rights violations, promoted Holocaust education and advanced U.S.–Israel relations.

After graduation from Harvard in 1991, Eisen practiced law in Washington, D.C. for more than 18 years with the Zuckerman Spaeder law firm. He was named as one of Washington's top lawyers by Washingtonian magazine. He specialized in investigations of complex financial fraud, including Enron, Refco, the ADM antitrust case, and the subprime financial collapse.

In 2003, Eisen co-founded Citizens for Responsibility and Ethics in Washington (CREW), a government watchdog organization. From 2016 until February 11, 2019, he was chair of the board and co-counsel on litigation matters, including emoluments cases in New York and Maryland federal courts (CREW v. Trump and D.C. and Maryland v. Trump, respectively).

From 2007 to 2009, Eisen was active in the presidential campaign of his law school classmate Barack Obama before joining the transition team of then-President-elect Obama as deputy counsel. On January 20, 2009, Obama named him special counsel for ethics and government reform in the White House.

He earned the nickname "Dr. No" for his stringent ethics and anti-corruption efforts and became known for limiting registered lobbyists from taking positions in the administration. President Obama recalls in his autobiography that when asked once what sorts of out-of-town conferences were okay for administration officials to attend, his response was short and to the point: “If it sounds fun, you can’t go.”  He is credited for helping compile President Obama's ethics-related campaign promises into an Executive Order the president signed on his first day in office.

During 2009 and 2010, Eisen also contributed to the administration's open government effort, including putting the White House visitor logs on the internet; its response to the campaign finance decision in Citizens United v. FEC; and its financial regulatory plan, which is the basis for Dodd–Frank. His other activities included reviewing the background of potential administration officials, and expanding the application of the Freedom of Information Act.

Eisen became the first Ambassador to the Czech Republic nominated by President Obama. As ambassador, he developed a "three pillars" approach to the U.S.–Czech relationship, emphasizing (1) strategic and defense cooperation; (2) commercial and economic ties; and (3) shared values. During his time as ambassador, he spent hundreds of thousands of dollars per year out of his own pocket to maintain the ambassador's residence and entertain dignitaries.

Eisen visited Czech and U.S. troops serving side by side in Afghanistan. He advocated for U.S. business, and saw bilateral trade increases with the Czech Republic during his tenure of 50 percent (more than three times the average for U.S. embassies in Europe at the time). He also spoke out against corruption and in defense of civil rights. Eisen has been credited with helping to deepen U.S.-Czech relations. He also supported the Middle East peace process, including posting the first investment conference on the "Kerry Plan" in Prague together with former British Prime Minister Tony Blair and former secretary of state Madeleine Albright."

Eisen's ambassadorship was also noteworthy because his mother was a Czechoslovak Holocaust survivor who had been deported by the Nazis from that country to Auschwitz. As Senator Joseph Lieberman noted in introducing Eisen at a Senate hearing: "It is indeed a profound historical justice... that the Ambassador's residence in Prague, which was originally built by a Jewish family that was forced to flee Prague by the Nazis, who... took over that house as their headquarters, now 70 years later, is occupied by Norman and his family... The story of Norm Eisen and his family and their path back to Europe is a classic American story, a reflection of what our country is about at its very best. And that is also precisely why the Ambassador has proven such an effective representative of our Nation, our interests, and our values."

President Obama initially gave Eisen a recess appointment. The appointment was good for only one year, until the end of 2011, unless the full U.S. Senate confirmed him. The recess appointment was required because of a hold on Eisen's nomination. The leaders of several Washington good-government groups authored a letter in support of Eisen's appointment. Eisen's nomination received bipartisan support, including from Republican senators and conservative foreign policy scholars. The Senate ultimately confirmed Eisen on December 12, 2011.

He joined the Brookings Institution as a visiting fellow in September 2014.  He is now a senior fellow in their Governance Studies program and is the project chair of a research initiative on reducing corruption. At Brookings he has contributed to reports on open government, the emoluments clause, presidential obstruction of justice, and anti-corruption efforts in the natural resource sector. A prolific writer, he often contributes op-ed pieces to The New York Times, The Washington Post, Politico, USA Today, and other national publications.

In September 2018, Crown published Eisen's The Last Palace: Europe's Turbulent Century in Five Lives and One Legendary House. It is a sweeping history of 1918 to 2018 as seen through the windows of the Villa Petschek, a Prague palace built by Jewish businessman Otto Petschek after World War I, occupied by the Nazis later, and now the American ambassador's residence in Prague. He has also authored "Democracy's Defenders: U.S. Embassy Prague, the Fall of Communism in Czechoslovakia, and Its Aftermath" and "A Case for the American People: The United States v. Donald J. Trump."

In February 2019, Eisen was appointed consultant to the United States House Committee on the Judiciary. He assisted the committee on oversight matters related to the Department of Justice, including impeachment, and other oversight and policy issues within the committee's jurisdiction. A columnist at The Washington Post called Eisen a "critical force in building the case for impeachment." Eisen later wrote a book about his time as special counsel. 

With Colby Galliher, Eisen co-authored a book entitled, Overcoming Trumpery, which was published by Brookings Institution Press in 2022. 

Eisen was a co-founder of the States United Democracy Center in 2021 and serves today as its executive chair. In his States United capacity, he signed a bar complaint against John C. Eastman and an ethics complaint filed against Jenna Ellis for their roles in undermining the 2020 election results. He served as co-counsel on an amicus brief filed in opposition to Lindsey Graham's motion to quash a subpoena in the Fulton County Special Grand Jury investigation of attempts to overturn the 2020 election results in Georgia. Eisen has co-written reports for States United including a guide to the Electoral College vote count and the January 6, 2021, meeting of Congress. With his States United co-founders, Joanna Lydgate and Christine Todd Whitman, Eisen was a winner of the 2022 Brown Democracy Medal, given by the McCourtney Institute for Democracy at Pennsylvania State University.

In popular culture

Director Wes Anderson has credited Ambassador Eisen as an inspiration for the character of Deputy Kovacs in his 2014 film The Grand Budapest Hotel. Anderson told Jeff Goldblum, who played Deputy Kovacs, "that he should go to Prague and see Norm; this is your man… The character of the lawyer Kovacs in the film maintains the awareness of law and justice… the character is actually a kind of ethics czar for the whole film." This is a reference to another one of Eisen's White House nicknames: The Ethics Czar.  Anderson again referred to Eisen in the closing scene of Isle of Dogs, captioning a character as ethics czar in the new government of Megasaki.

In 2017, Eisen was named number 11 on the Politico 50 list of thinkers shaping American politics. Eisen has also been named to the Forward 50 list of American Jews.

References

External links 

 Official website
 Brookings Institution page
 "The Last Palace" book website
 Bio of Ambassador Eisen from the homepage of The U.S. Embassy In The Czech Republic
 Ambassador Eisen's blog
 The Former White House Ethics Lawyer Umpiring Trump’s Washington (from The Washington Monthly)
 Eternal Optimist (from Mispacha Magazine)
 Advocate (from Tablet Magazine)
 "The Worst Hour of His Entire Life": Cohen, Manafort, and the Twin Courtroom Dramas that Changed Trump's Presidency (from The New Yorker)
 When White House Has Queries About Ethics Rules, Adviser Norm Eisen Answers the Call (from The Washington Post)
 The world of Norm Eisen, U.S. ambassador to the Czech Republic (from The Washington Post)
 Is Trump Inc. the President’s Greatest Vulnerability? (from New York Magazine)
 ‘It’s Like a Powder Keg That’s Going to Explode’ (from Politico)
 Transforming a Home's Dark History (from The Wall Street Journal)
 NPR article on Eisen's Ambassadorship
 HN Weekend article about Eisen's influence on Wes Anderson's "Grand Budapest Hotel"
 White House press release announcing Eisen as the new Ambassador to the Czech Republic

1960 births
Ambassadors of the United States to the Czech Republic
American expatriates in the Czech Republic
20th-century American Jews
American lawyers
Brown University alumni
Harvard Law School alumni
Living people
People from Los Angeles
Obama administration personnel
Recess appointments
American political consultants
Jewish American attorneys
21st-century American Jews
21st-century American diplomats